Börte (simply Borte, also Börte Üjin;; Cyrillic: Бөртэ үжин; c. 1161–1230) was the first wife of Temüjin, who became Genghis Khan, the founder of the Mongol Empire. Börte became the head of the first Court of Genghis Khan, and Grand Empress of his Empire. Little is known about the details of her early life, but she was betrothed to Genghis at a young age, married at seventeen, and then kidnapped by a rival tribe. Her husband's daring rescue of her may have been one of the key events that started him on his path to becoming a conqueror. She gave birth to four sons and five daughters, who, along with their own descendants, were the key bloodline that further expanded the Mongol Empire.

Borte and Hoelun, Genghis' mother, were some of the most influential and important people in the Khan's life.

Early life 
Few historical facts are known about her early life, but Mongolians have many legends about her.  What little is known is generally from The Secret History of the Mongols.

Börte was born around 1161 into the Olkhonud of Khongirad. This tribe was friendly to the Borjigin tribe, into which Temüjin was born. She was the daughter of Dei-Sechen and Chotan. She was described as having a "fair complexion" with "light in her face and fire in her eyes," meaning that she was intelligent. The girls that came from the Olkhonud tribe were known for being particularly beautiful. The marriage was arranged by her father and Yesügei, Genghis' father, when she was 10 and he was 9 years old. Temüjin then stayed with her family until he was called back to help his mother and younger siblings, due to the poisoning of Yesügei by an enemy.

In 1178, approximately 7 years later, Temüjin traveled downstream along the Kelüren River to find Börte. When Dei-Sechen saw that Temüjin had returned for Börte he was delighted and had the pair "united as man and wife". With the permission of Dei-Sechen, he took Börte and her mother to live in his family's yurt, which was camped along the Senggür river. Börte's dowry was a fine black sable jacket.

Abduction and rescue 
Soon after she married Temüjin, the Three Merkits attacked the family camp at dawn. Temüjin, and his family and friends were able to escape on horses, but there was no horse left for Börte to escape on. She was taken captive by the Merkits and given to one of their warriors as a spoil of war (along with Sochigel and a maid). The raid was in retaliation for the abduction of Hoelun, Temüjin's mother, by his father Yesügei many years earlier. Temüjin was deeply distressed by the abduction of his wife and remarked that his bed "was made empty" and his breast was "torn apart". He was determined to bring Börte back, and rescued her several months later with the aid of his allies Wang Khan and Jamukha. Some scholars describe this event as one of the key crossroads in Temüjin's life, which moved him along the path towards becoming a conqueror.Börte had been held captive for eight months, and she gave birth to Jochi after she was rescued, leaving doubt as to who the father of the child was, because her captor took her as a "wife", and therefore could have possibly impregnated her. However, Genghis let Jochi remain with his family and claimed him as his own son. He was supposed to be Genghis' successor but because of his doubt of being Jochi's real father, his brothers would not accept him as ruler and Genghis had to choose another son. Jochi then became leader of the Golden Horde.

Grand Empress 
Börte was the senior and first wife of Temüjin. She was revered by the Mongols after he became Genghis Khan, and she was crowned the Grand Empress. Börte on several occasions heavily influenced her husband's decisions. One such occasion was when Otčigin came into Genghis Khan's tent while he was still in bed with Börte, and asked for help against the Qongqotan tribe. Before Genghis Khan could say anything, Börte "sat up in bed, covering her breasts with the edge of the blanket" and described the cruelty of the Qongqotan. After listening to his wife speak, Genghis Khan decided to help Otčigin.

As Genghis Khan continued to expand his influence and empire, Börte remained behind and assisted Genghis' brother Temüge in ruling the Mongol homeland. Other wives accompanied Genghis Khan on his campaigns, while she ruled her own territory and managed her own court. Most of the Kherlen River was assigned to her, land that had before belonged to the Tatars. Only her sons were considered to be candidates to succeed Temüjin as Khans.

Börte is often portrayed as "a beautiful woman dressed in a white silken gown, with gold coins in her hair, holding a white lamb, and riding a white steed".

Children 

Börte's sons:
 Jochi
 Chagatai
 Ögedei
 Tolui

Daughters:
 Kua Ujin Bekhi, the eldest, was betrothed to Tusakha, son of Senggum, and grandson of Wang Khan, ruler of the Keraite tribe; she eventually married Botu, of the Ikires tribe, and widower of her paternal aunt Temulun.
 Alakhai Bekhi, married first to Alaqush Digit Quri, chieftain of the Ongüt tribe; then to his nephew and heir Jingue; and finally to her stepson Boyaohe
 Tümelün, married to Chigu, son of Alchi , son of Dei Seichen, Börte's father
 Alaltun married Chaur Setsen, son of Taiju Kurgen of the Olkanut tribe. She is often confused with Il-Alti, a daughter by a concubine, who was given to the Uyghur chieftain Idi Qut.
 Checheikhen, married to Törölchi, son of Quduka beki, of the Oirat tribe.

Modern representations 
Given her significant role in Genghis Khan's life, Börte has appeared as a prominent character in the many films and television series based on her husband's life and conquests. The actresses who have portrayed her include Susan Hayward in The Conqueror, Françoise Dorléac in Genghis Khan and Chuluuny Khulan in the 2007 Oscar nominated Russian film Mongol.

See also
List of kidnappings

References

Sources 

 René Grousset. Conqueror of the World: The Life of Chingis-khan (New York: The Viking Press, 1944) .
 
 Man, John. Genghis Khan: Life, Death and Resurrection (London; New York : Bantam Press, 2004) .
  
  

1160s births
13th-century deaths
People from Khentii Province
12th-century Mongolian women
13th-century Mongolian women
Formerly missing people
Kidnapped people
Missing person cases in China
Mongol empresses
Year of birth unknown
Wives of Genghis Khan